Yannis, Yiannis, or Giannis (Γιάννης) is a common Greek given name, a variant of John (Hebrew) meaning "God is gracious." In formal Greek (e.g. all government documents and birth certificates) the name exists only as  Ioannis (Ιωάννης). Variants include  Yannis (Also Janni), Iannis, Yannakis, Yanis, and the rare Yannos, usually found in the Peloponnese and Cyprus.

Feminine forms are Γιάννα (Yianna, Gianna) and Ιωάννα (Ioanna) which is the formal variant used in formal/government documents.

Yannis may refer to:

Abu'l-Fath Yanis, Fatimid vizier
Giannis Agouris, Greek writer and journalist
Ioannis Amanatidis, Greek footballer
Yannis Anastasiou, Greek footballer
Yiannis Andrianopoulos, Greek footballer
Giannis Antetokounmpo, Greek basketball player
Giannis Apostolidis, Greek footballer
Yiannis Arabatzis, Greek goalkeeper
Yannis Bakos, economist
Ioannis Banias (1939–2012), Greek politician
Yannis Behrakis, Greek photojournalist 
Giannis Bezos, Greek actor and director
Yiannis Bourousis, Greek basketball player
Yannis Brown, composer
Yiannis Carras, Greek shipping magnate
Giannis Chondrogiannis, Greek politician 
Jani Christou, Greek composer
Giannis Chrysafis, Greek footballer
Ioannis Damanakis, Greek footballer
Giannis Dragasakis, Greek politician 
Yiannis Dritsas, the inventor of Greek instant frappé
Yiannis Eitziridis, Greek musician
Giannis Fysekis, Greek footballer
Giannis Gagaloudis, Greek basketball player
Giannis Galanakis, Greek entrepreneur and inventor of Greek artisan prosciutto
Giannis Galitsios, Greek footballer
Giannis Georgallis, Greek basketball player
Giannis Giannoulis, Greek-Canadian basketball player
Giannis Gionakis, Greek actor
Yannis Goumas, Greek footballer
Ioannis Gounaris, Greek footballer
Yiannis Grivas, Greek judge
 Ioannis Hatzidakis, Greek mathematician
Yannis Hotzeas, Greek communist thinker
Yanni (Yiánnis Hryssomállis), Greek composer, keyboardist
Giannis Iliopoulos, Greek basketball player
Giannis Ioannidis, Greek basketball coach and politician
Giannis Kalambokis, Greek basketball player
Ioannis Kalitzakis, Greek footballer
Giannis Katemis, Greek footballer
Yannis Kondos, Greek poet
Yannis Kontos, Greek photojournalist
Yiannis Koskiniatis, Greek footballer
Yiannis Kouros, Greek ultramarathon runner
Ioannis Kyrastas, Greek footballer and football manager
Giannis Kyriakopoulos, Greek basketball player
Yiannis Latsis, Greek shipping tycoon
Giannis Liourdis, Greek footballer
Yannis Makriyannis, Greek General
Yannis Manakis, Greek photographer
Giannis Maniatis, Greek footballer
Yannis Margaritis, Greek theater director
Giannis Markopoulos, Greek composer
Giannis Mihalopoulos, Greek actor
Giannis Milonas, Greek basketball player
Yiannis Moralis, Greek artist
Yiannis N. Moschovakis, Greek theorist
Yiannis Okkas, Cypriot footballer
Yiannis Papadopoulos, Greek footballer 
Yiannis Papaioannou, Greek composer
Yannis Papathanasiou, Greek politician
Yiannis Parios, Greek singer
Giannis Pasas, Greek footballer
Yiannis Patilis, Greek poet
Yannis Pathiakakis Stadium, Greek stadium
Giannis Pechlivanis, Greek footballer
Yiannis Pharmakis, Greek leader
Yannis Philippakis, Guitarist and lead singer of Foals
Giannis Ploutarhos, Greek singer
Yiannis Poulakas, Greek painter and stage designer
Giannis Poulopoulos, Greek singer
Yannis Psycharis, Greek author and philologist
Yiannis Psychopedis, Greek art movement
Yiannis Ritsos, Greek poet
Yannis Salibur, French footballer
Ioannis Samaras, Greek footballer
Giannis Sampson, Cypriot footballer
Yannis K. Semertzidis, Greek physicist
Giannis Sfakianakis, Greek footballer
Giannis Sioutis, Greek basketball player
Yiannis Skarimbas, Greek writer
Giannis Skopelitis, Greek footballer
Yannis Smaragdis, Greek film director
Giannis Sotirhos, Greek footballer
Yiannis Spyropoulos, Greek painter
Yannis Stavrou, Greek painter
Yannis Tafer, French footballer
Yannis Tamtakos, Greek political activist
Giannis Taralidis, Greek footballer
Yianis Tomaras, Greek footballer
Yiannis Tridimas, Greek long-distance runner
Yannis Tsarouchis, Greek painter
Giannis Valaoras, Greek footballer
Giannis Valinakis, Greek politician
Giannis Vardinogiannis, Greek businessman 
Yanis Varoufakis, Greek economist 
Yannis Varveris, Greek poet
Giannis Vogiatzis, Greek actor
Iannis Xenakis, Greek composer
Yiannis Xipolitas, Cypriot footballer
Yannis Xirotiris, Greek educator
Yannis Yfantis, Greek writer and poet
Giannis Zapropoulos, Greek footballer
Giannis Zaradoukas, Greek footballer
Yanis (singer), full name Yanis Sahraoui, French singer-songwriter formerly known as Sliimy
Yanis C. Yortsos, current Dean of the Viterbi School of Engineering at the University of Southern California
Yanis Kanidis (1930–2004), a Greek-Russian physical education teacher
Yanis Papassarantis (born 1988), a Belgian football player of Greek origin
Yanis Smits, a Latvian theologian active against the Soviet rule over Latvia during 1956–1976

See also 
 Alternate forms for the name John
 
 
 Janis (disambiguation)

Greek masculine given names